Dave Jorgenson is an American video producer. He is best known as the face of The Washington Posts TikTok account. The account has 1.4 million followers and 58.2 million likes .

Early life
Dave Jorgenson was born to Mary and Mark Jorgenson. He graduated from Shawnee Mission North High School in Overland Park, Kansas, in 2009. He was the sports editor for the school's yearbook, and member of the Pep Club, drumline, theater and basketball. Jorgenson attended the University of Tulsa and graduated from DePauw University in 2013 with a Bachelor of Arts in creative writing. Jorgenson was an Eagle Scout.

Career
Jorgenson interned at The Colbert Report during the 2012 election. From 2014 to 2017, he produced videos for the Independent Journal Review. In May 2017, he joined The Washington Post as a creative video producer, where he wrote and produced their "Department of Satire" series. He launched the newspaper's TikTok account in May 2019, after which it quickly went viral.

The account's videos focus largely on newsroom operations, making use of nerd humor. , it has 1.1 million followers and its videos have garnered 44.9 million likes. The Atlantic described the account as "self-aware, slapstick, and slightly cringey—a parade of pets, stunts, and workplace humor, often set to blaring pop music and shot through with a winking sense of humor about the very fact that a 142-year-old newspaper is even on here in the first place".

Jorgenson has drawn attention for his project's success in connecting with Generation Z, a task that many other mainstream newspapers have struggled with.

Jorgenson published a book titled Make a TikTok Every Day in June 2021, which features one TikTok video idea for every day of the year and includes 12 interviews with creators.

Personal life
Jorgenson resides with his wife, Mariana, in a one-bedroom apartment where he films many of his videos.

References

External links

Author page at The Washington Post

Year of birth missing (living people)
Place of birth missing (living people)
Living people
DePauw University alumni
American media personalities
American TikTokers
The Washington Post journalists